Mihael Žaper (born 11 August 1998) is a Croatian professional footballer who plays as a midfielder for Osijek in the Croatian First Football League.

Club career 
Žaper made his professional debut with Osijek in a 4–2 Croatian First Football League loss to NK Inter Zaprešić on 13 May 2016, scoring his side's second goal in his debut.

International career
Žaper was born in Croatia, and was called up to represent the Croatia U21 at the 2021 UEFA European Under-21 Championship.

Career statistics

Club

References

External links
 
 HNS Profile

1998 births
Living people
Sportspeople from Osijek
Association football midfielders
Croatian footballers
Croatia youth international footballers
Croatia under-21 international footballers
NK Osijek players
Croatian Football League players
First Football League (Croatia) players